The 203rd Pennsylvania House of Representatives District is located in Philadelphia County and includes the following areas:

 Ward 10
 Ward 35 [PART, Divisions 09, 10, 11, 13, 14, 16, 17, 18, 19, 20, 21, 22, 25, 27, 28 and 31]
 Ward 61 [PART, Divisions 04, 05, 06, 08, 09, 10, 11, 12, 13, 14, 15, 16, 17, 18, 19, 20, 21, 22, 23, 24, 25, 26, 27 and 28]
These wards correspond to parts of the West Oak Lane, Olney, and Crescentville neighborhoods of the city.

Representatives

References

Government of Philadelphia
203